Kashiwabara is a Japanese surname. Notable people with the surname include:

Shuji Kashiwabara
Emperor Go-Kashiwabara
Yoshie Kashiwabara
Michiko Kashiwabara

See also
Kashiwabara Station
Kashiwabara-juku
Shinano, Nagano, created by the merger of Kashiwabara and Fujisato
Severo-Kurilsk, the town in the Kuril Islands known as Kashiwabara during Japanese rule

Japanese-language surnames